Navina Bole is an Indian television actress.  She is known for playing the role of Diya Bhushan in  Miley Jab Hum Tum(2008), Priya in Jeannie Aur Juju (2014) and Tia in Ishqbaaaz (2016).

Career
Navina Bole was born in Mumbai. She received a degree in commerce and trained as a Bharat Natyam dancer. 

She started her career with modeling before appearing in television commercials for brands including Fair & Lovely, Dabur Vatika, Fair one, Chevrolet, Reliance, and Nokia. She has also done music videos for Jagjit Singh, Ghulam Ali, Abida Parveen, Amaan & Ayaan Ali Bangash, DJ Jayanta Pathak & DJ Taral.

Personal life
Navina Bole dated actor and producer Karran Jeet and became engaged to him on January 22, 2017. They married in March 2017. The couple have been blessed by a baby girl. Karran Jeet is appeared in movies, television series and short films like Paharganj (2019) and Section 375 (2019), Adaalat (2015) and First Date (2016).

Television

References

External links
 Navina Bole on IMDb

Indian television actresses
Living people
1983 births
21st-century Indian actresses
Indian film actresses
Actresses in Hindi television